Sheryl Zohn is an American television writer and producer. She has written or produced for Showtime's Penn & Teller: Bullshit!, CNBC's Dennis Miller, Comedy Central's Straight Plan for the Gay Man, the Game Show Network's Friend or Foe?, VH1's Best Week Ever, and The Scariest Places on Earth.

Zohn lives in Los Angeles. She is married to The Daily Show writer Rob Kutner. In addition to her television work, she was a contributing author to the anthology The Modern Jewish Girl's Guide to Guilt. She has also contributed to American Bystander, Mad Magazine, The Weekly Humorist, and Belladonna Comedy. She was nominated for Writers Guild of America Awards in 2006, 2007, and 2008, and for Emmy Awards in 2007 and 2009. She was a 2015 Honoree of the Writers Guild of America, West's Feature Writer Access Project.

In 2019, Zohn launched her podcast "Who's Next Door" with her walking buddy Jesse Lainer-Vos.

References

External links
 
 Personal site for Sheryl Zohn
 Site for "Who's Next Door" podcast

Year of birth missing (living people)
Living people
American television writers
American television producers
American women television producers
American women television writers
21st-century American women writers
21st-century American screenwriters